Těšetice may refer to places in the Czech Republic:

Těšetice (Olomouc District), a municipality and village in the Olomouc Region
Těšetice (Znojmo District), a municipality and village in the South Moravian Region
Těšetice, a village and administrative part of Bochov in the Karlovy Vary Region